The 13.2 mm Breda Model 31 was a widely used Italian heavy machine gun produced by Società Italiana Ernesto Breda and used by the Italian Navy and Italian Army during World War II. At sea it was employed as a light anti-aircraft gun, while on land it was mounted on armored command vehicles where it was used as a heavy machine gun.  After World War II it remained in use aboard the patrol boats of the Guardia di Finanza.

History  
The Breda Model 31 was a license built copy of the French Hotchkiss M1929 machine gun. Breda acquired a production license in 1929, but it did not enter production until 1931.  The Model 31 was often mounted on single and twin mounts aboard surface ships and on a disappearing twin mount aboard submarines.   The Model 31 was intended to provide close-range air defense, but like its counterparts in other nations, these small-caliber guns were found incapable of defending against low-level torpedo-bombers or high altitude level-bomber attacks because their bullets were too light and short ranged.  Although a reliable gun with good performance, it was later replaced by the Breda 20/65 Mod. 1935.

Construction 
The Model 31 was a gas-operated, air-cooled machine gun with a tilting bolt action.  It was fed by top mounted, semi-circular, thirty round magazines, with cooling air drawn through the sleeve to fins along the barrel.

Naval use 
Ship classes that carried the Breda Model 1931 include:

Italy 

Adua-class
Archimede-class
Argo-class
Balilla-class
Brin-class
Cagni-class
Calvi-class
Ciclone-class
Conte di Cavour-class
Curtatone-class
Flutto-class
Foca-class
Folgore-class
Freccia-class
Giussano-class
Glauco-class
Liuzzi-class
Maestrale-class
Marcello-class
Marconi-class
Navigatori-class
Oriani-class
Orsa-class
Perla-class
Sauro-class
Sella-class
Soldati-class
Spica-class
Squalo-class
Trento-class
Turbine-class
Zara-class

Sweden 
T11 torpedo boat
T14 torpedo boat

Users 
 Italian Navy
 Swedish navy – designated 13,2 mm kulspruta M/It (13,2 mm ksp M/It)

Notes

References 

La mitrailleuse Browning FN, kapitel XII. Les munitions F.N. calibre 13,2 mm

World War II naval weapons
Naval guns of Italy